This is a list of reserves in New Zealand that have been distinguished or treated as Kauri Parks, these include reserves or parks that include the tree Agathis australis, the New Zealand Kauri.

Northland Region

Waipoua Forest, a large forest in Western Northland
Trounson Kauri Park, a forest in Northland
HB Matthews Reserve, a closed forest as of 2019 to prevent the spread of Kauri dieback
Puketi Kauri Forest, a forest near Kerikeri in Eastern Northland
Omahuta Kauri Forest, a forest next to Puketi Kauri Forest
Warawara Forest, home to a large amount of Kauri

Auckland Region 

Waitākere Ranges, home to multiple Kauri Forests
Hunua Ranges, large tracts of Kauri forests still remain intact.
Cornwall Park, home to a small plantation of Kauri, however under threat from a growing population of Common brushtail possum.
Ngaheretuku Reserve, a closed forest as of 2019 to prevent the spread of Kauri dieback
Kerr-Taylor Reserve, a closed forest as of 2019 to prevent the spread of Kauri Dieback
Matuku Reserve, a closed forest as of 2019 to prevent the spread of Kauri Dieback
Onetangi Reserve, a closed forest as of 2019 to prevent the spread of Kauri Dieback
Kauri Park (reserve), a closed forest as of 2019 to prevent the spread of Kauri Dieback

Waikato Region

Coromandel Peninsula 

Waiau Kauri Grove, many Kauri are present in this chunk of forest
Moehau Range, multiple mature Kauri are present
Kauri Block Track, many Kauri live here
Square Kauri, a large Kauri forest
Manaia Forest, a sanctuary for Kauri and other flora

Elsewhere in the Waikato Region 

Hakarimata Range, home to multiple large Kauri

References

Kauri Parks